Weisenberger is a German surname. Notable people with this surname include:

 Elvira Weisenberger (born 1949), Argentinian tennis player
 Gerhard Weisenberger (born 1952), German wrestler
 Jack Weisenberger (1926–2019), American football and baseball player
 John Weisenberger, Guam attorney general
 Karl Weisenberger (1890–1952), German general

See also
 Weisenburger
 Weissenberger